Thorleif Olsen (15 November 1921 – 11 March 1996) was a Norwegian football player. He was born in Kristiania, and played for the sports club Vålerengens IF. He played for the Norwegian national team at the 1952 Summer Olympics in Helsinki. He was capped 34 times for Norway between 1950 and 1955.

References

External links

1921 births
1996 deaths
Footballers from Oslo
Norwegian footballers
Norway international footballers
Vålerenga Fotball players
Footballers at the 1952 Summer Olympics
Olympic footballers of Norway
Association football defenders